Katherine Brown (born June 21, 1960) is an American politician and attorney who served as the 38th governor of Oregon from 2015 to 2023. A member of the Democratic Party, she served three terms as the state representative from the 13th district of the Oregon House of Representatives from 1991 to 1997, three terms as the state senator from the 21st district of the Oregon Senate from 1997 to 2009, three terms as majority leader of the Oregon Senate from 2003 to 2009, and two terms as Oregon Secretary of State from 2009 to 2015. She assumed the governorship upon the resignation of John Kitzhaber in 2015. She was elected to serve out the remainder of his gubernatorial term in the special election in 2016 and was reelected to a full term in 2018.

As an openly bisexual woman, Brown has made history several times through her electoral success. In 2008, she became the first openly LGBT person elected secretary of state within a U.S. state, and the first openly LGBT person elected to statewide office in any U.S. state. In 2016, she became the first openly LGBT person elected governor of a U.S. state and the second woman elected governor of Oregon (after Barbara Roberts). By the end of her term, Brown had the lowest approval ratings of any incumbent U.S. governor at that time.

Early life and education 
Brown was born in Torrejón de Ardoz in Spain, where her father, Dr. James Paterson Brown, an eye doctor, was serving in the United States Air Force, at Torrejón Air Base. She grew up in Minnesota and graduated from Mounds View High School in Arden Hills, Minnesota in 1978. She earned a Bachelor of Arts in Environmental Conservation with a certificate in women's studies from the University of Colorado Boulder in 1981 and a J.D. degree and certificate in environmental law from the Lewis & Clark College Law School in 1985.

Career

Oregon Legislative Assembly 

Brown was appointed to the Oregon House of Representatives in 1991, filling a vacancy in a Portland seat left by predecessor Judy Bauman, who took an executive appointment. She was elected to a second term before being elected to the Oregon State Senate in 1996. Two years later, she was elected Senate Democratic Leader. In 2003, she was elected Majority Leader of the Oregon Senate.

Brown was a top fundraiser for her caucus, helping the Democrats tie the Republicans in the Oregon Senate in 2003. That same year she also won the position of caucus leader. Brown helped round up votes to pass a bill that year reforming the Oregon Public Employees Retirement System, although she ultimately voted against it to preserve her relationship with labor unions.

In July 2007, Brown announced that she would give up her seat in the Oregon Senate to be a candidate for Oregon Secretary of State the next year. On May 20, 2008, Brown won the election for the Democratic nomination for Secretary of State, and on November 5 she won the general election by a 51–46% margin against Republican candidate Rick Dancer.

Oregon Secretary of State 
Coming into office, one of Brown's priorities was to perform rigorous performance audits to help balance the budget. In 2008, for every dollar the State spent, performance audits returned $8 in cost savings. In 2010 Brown reported she delivered $64 in cost savings and efficiencies for every dollar invested in the Division.

In 2009 Brown introduced and passed House Bill 2005 to crack down on fraud and abuse in the initiative and referendum system. It gave the Secretary of State more power to prosecute fraud and enforce the constitutional ban on paying per signature on initiatives.

Brown also implemented online voter registration. As of March 2010, a year after its introduction, Oregon Public Broadcasting noted nearly 87,000 Oregonians had already registered online to vote.

In 2009 the Aspen Institute named Brown as one of 24 "Rising Stars" in American politics and awarded her a Rodel Fellowship. The program is a two-year fellowship designed to break down partisan barriers and explore the responsibilities of public leadership and good governance.

In October 2012 StateTech magazine highlighted Brown's use of iPad and tablet technology to increase accessibility for voters with disabilities. In 2011 Oregon became the first jurisdiction in the country to use this technology to help voters with disabilities mark their ballots.

In January 2015 Brown submitted a letter to the Federal Communications Commission (FCC) in support of the purchase of Time Warner Cable by Comcast that had been almost entirely ghostwritten by Comcast, a company that has made a total of over $10,000 in donations to her past election campaigns.

Governor of Oregon 
On February 18, 2015, Governor John Kitzhaber resigned amid a public corruption scandal just three months after his reelection; Brown succeeded him since the Constitution of Oregon identifies the secretary of state as the successor when the governor leaves office prematurely.

Brown named Brian Shipley, a lobbyist for Oregon Health & Science University and former deputy chief of staff to Governor Ted Kulongoski, as her chief of staff. She appointed Jeanne Atkins secretary of state.

Upon taking office, Brown extended the moratorium on executions Kitzhaber had enacted. In 2015, she also signed a "motor voter" bill she had championed while secretary of state, to automatically register voters using their driver's license data. At Politico's "State Solutions" voter engagement conference, Brown said, "Registration is a barrier to people participating in this process" and "Voting is a fundamental right of being a citizen, and people across the country should have the ability to access this fundamental right without barriers like registration". Addressing critics of policies aimed at increasing voter turnout, such as Oregon's "motor voter" law, she said, "I think the good news is, in Oregon, we actually want people to vote in our state."

In July 2016 Brown signed HB3402, which raised the maximum speed limit to 70 mph on I-82 and sections of I-84 and US-95. Previously the maximum speed limit on Oregon highways was 65 mph. This bill also raised speed limits on non-interstate highways in eastern Oregon from 55 mph to 65 mph.

Oregon law required a special election in November 2016 for the two years remaining in Kitzhaber's unfinished term as governor. By April 2016 Brown had raised over $800,000 for her campaign in 2016 alone, while her closest Democratic primary competitor, Julian Bell, had raised $33,000. She defeated Bell, Chet Chance, Kevin M. Forsythe, Steve Johnson, and Dave Stauffer for the Democratic nomination. She won the general election against Republican Party nominee Bud Pierce, Independent Party nominee Cliff Thomason, Libertarian Party nominee James Foster, and Constitution Party nominee Aaron Donald Auer, receiving 51% of the vote.

In January 2017, Brown named Nik Blosser her third chief of staff after the resignation of former chief of staff Kristen Leonard. In June 2017, Brown signed into law the Oregon Equal Pay Act, which banned employers from using job seekers' prior salaries in hiring decisions, and a transgender equity bill.

Brown was reelected in November 2018, defeating Republican Knute Buehler 50.0% to 43.9%, with Independent Party nominee Patrick Starnes, Libertarian Party nominee Nick Chen, Constitution Party nominee Aaron Auer, and Progressive Party nominee Chris Henry taking the remaining votes. She had received 82% in the Democratic primary.

In a November 2018 budget plan Brown proposed a 30-year plan to limit Oregon's greenhouse gas emissions via a cap-and-trade system. On June 20, 2019, Brown authorized state troopers to search for and return 11 Republican state senators after the Oregon Senate ordered the Sergeant-at-Arms to compel them to attend a Senate session. The senators had left to prevent a quorum in the Senate and thereby block the passage of a sweeping climate change bill.

In 2019, after a measles outbreak in Oregon, Brown urged parents to vaccinate their children.

In response to the ongoing global COVID-19 pandemic, Brown publicly urged Oregonians to stay home to avoid spreading the virus, but was initially criticized for not issuing a shelter-in-place order. The order was officially issued on March 23, 2020.

In August 2021, The Oregonian wrote, "Gov. Kate Brown signed a law to allow Oregon students to graduate without proving they can write or do math."

In December 2022, Brown commuted the sentences of all 17 people on death row in Oregon, calling the death penalty "dysfunctional and immoral" and something that "had never been administered fairly or equitably in Oregon."

Criticism 
As secretary of state, Brown faced political backlash over the scheduling of the election for labor commissioner between Democrat Brad Avakian and Republican Bruce Starr. The election for this position is typically held in May, but in 2009 the Oregon legislature passed bipartisan House Bill 2095, which required the election to be held in November 2012. Despite this, Starr accused Brown of pushing the election to November to help Avakian win. Brown called his accusations "unfounded and outrageous", saying her office was simply enforcing a "very clear" law, and that "this is an issue of election law, not politics". Starr filed a lawsuit attempting to force Brown to hold the election in May, but the lawsuit was denied because Starr could not show he was likely to prevail on the merits of his case.

In March 2018, Brown was criticized for firing state librarian MaryKay Dahlgreen, a move that surprised members of the Oregon State Library Board of Directors. She was accused of mismanaging Oregon DHS Child Welfare in audits published in January 2018.

In July 2018, Brown brokered meetings between several large Oregon-based companies, including Nike, and union leaders over campaigns to include Initiative Petition 25, a corporate transparency initiative, and Measure 104, geared toward limiting reductions in corporate tax breaks, on the November ballot. Brown's office said her goal was to prevent both initiatives from coming to fruition. She later faced complaints over the alleged brokering of an agreement—supposedly in exchange for financial support through a Nike PAC—in order to keep Petition 25 off the ballot. That year, Nike founder Phil Knight contributed over $1 million to Brown's Republican opponent's campaign, although the company itself gave financial support to Brown. Only a week after the submission of an official complaint, Oregon's Department of Justice found no grounds for an investigation, with the Department's Criminal Justice Division chief council writing, "there is no information that the proponents of [Initiative Petition 25] sought to qualify the petition for the ballot for an improper purpose." Brown and supporters later characterized the complaint as a political ploy. Initiative Petition 25's sponsors ultimately withheld it from the November ballot. Despite having obtained the requisite number of signatures before the submission deadline, union leaders cited an "internal decision", rather than Nike's or Brown's influence, in choosing not to proceed. With Measure 104 and several other anti-tax and anti-labor bills having already secured spaces on the ballot, AFSCME political director Joe Baessler called the issue a "question of resources".

Brown's process in appointing Misha Isaak, formerly her general attorney, to the Oregon Court of Appeals in August 2019 caused concern among members of the State Bar Association. After the Public Records Advocate resigned and released correspondence damaging to Isaak, more people called on Brown to revoke the appointment, including former Oregon Supreme Court Justice Edwin Peterson.

In November 2021, Brown had a 43% job approval rating, the lowest of any U.S. governor. The same poll found that her approval rating declined to 40% in October 2022, again the lowest in the country.

2019 recall attempt 
In 2019, the Oregon Republican Party and an independent group, "Flush Down Kate Brown", attempted to remove Brown by recall petition, but fell 40,790 signatures short of the required 280,050.

2020 recall attempt 
In 2020, Bill Currier, chairman of the Oregon Republican Party and mayor of Adair Village, launched another recall petition. It cited many of the concerns in the 2019 petition in addition to others, mostly focused on her handling of the COVID-19 pandemic in Oregon. Wilsonville activist Kelsey Massey started another petition. One must collect at least 280,050 signatures to trigger a verification process, the first step toward a recall election. On August 31, Currier announced that the recall would not be on the ballot because it had not received enough signatures. For the Massey petition, no signatures were submitted by the July 31 deadline.

Personal life 
Brown lives in Mahonia Hall. She lives with her husband, Dan Little and two stepchildren, Dylan and Jessie. She is the country's first openly bisexual statewide office holder and first openly bisexual governor.

Electoral history

Oregon State Senate

2004

Oregon Secretary of State

2008

2012

Governor of Oregon

2016

2018

Awards and distinctions 
 1995 – Recipient, Woman of Achievement Award from the Oregon Commission for Women
 2004 – Recipient, National Public and Community Service Award from the American Mental Health Counselors Association
 2007 – Recipient, President's Award of Merit from the Oregon State Bar
 2015 – Was listed as one of the nine runners-up for The Advocate'''s Person of the Year
 2017 – Named to the inaugural NBC Out #Pride30 list
 Profiles in Courage by Basic Rights Oregon

 See also 
List of U.S. state governors born outside the United States
 List of female governors in the United States
 List of female secretaries of state in the United States
 List of LGBT people from Portland, Oregon
 List of openly LGBT heads of government
 List of the first LGBT holders of political offices in the United States

 References 

 Further reading 
 Brad Schmidt, "Kate Brown: Next Oregon Governor Described as Tenacious, Personable," The Oregonian,'' February 13, 2015.

External links 

Governor of Oregon official government website
Kate Brown for Governor  campaign website

|-

|-

|-

|-

|-

1960 births
20th-century American lawyers
20th-century American politicians
20th-century American women politicians
21st-century American politicians
21st-century American women politicians
American women academics
Bisexual politicians
Bisexual women
Democratic Party governors of Oregon
Democratic Party members of the Oregon House of Representatives
Democratic Party Oregon state senators
Lawyers from Portland, Oregon
Lewis & Clark Law School alumni
LGBT people from Minnesota
LGBT state governors of the United States
LGBT state legislators in Oregon
Living people
People from Torrejón de Ardoz
Portland State University faculty
Secretaries of State of Oregon
University of Colorado Boulder alumni
Women state governors of the United States
Women state legislators in Oregon